The women's doubles of the 2015 Advantage Cars Prague Open tournament was played on clay in Prague, Czech Republic.

This was the 11th edition of the tournament.

Kateřina Kramperová and Bernarda Pera won the inaugural edition, defeating wildcards Miriam Kolodziejová and Markéta Vondroušová in the final, 7–6(7–4), 5–7, [10–1].

Seeds

Draw

References

External Links
 Draw

Advantage Cars Prague Open - Doubles
Advantage Cars Prague Open